Kinkora is an unincorporated community in Mansfield Township, in Burlington County, New Jersey, United States. This community used to be a rail terminal for the Kinkora branch and its junction with the Amboy Division of the railroad. The name "Kinkora" is of Native American origin, and the area was known as Quinkoringh.

Transportation
New Jersey Transit provides bus service to and from Philadelphia on the 409 route.

References

Mansfield Township, Burlington County, New Jersey
Unincorporated communities in Burlington County, New Jersey
Unincorporated communities in New Jersey